Sulli (1994–2019) was a South Korean singer, songwriter, actress and model.

Sulli may also refer to:
Massimo Sulli (born 1963), Italian judoka
Serena Sulli, a fictional character in the British children's series Grange Hill
Sulli Deals, cyber-stalking website in India

See also

Suli (disambiguation)
Sully (disambiguation)